Red Hot + Country (or RH+C) was the follow-up to No Alternative in the Red Hot Series of compilation albums, a series produced to raise awareness and money to fight AIDS/HIV as well as other related health and social issues. This compilation featured music from the classic country and classic rock genres performed by an assortment of seasoned old and new country music artists.

RH+C received two Grammy nominations following its release. A live show was held at the Ryman Auditorium — home to the Grand Ole Opry. A recording of the live show was eventually released on home video. Wilco, which had formed earlier in 1994, made their recorded debut on the compilation with their cover of Ernest Tubb's "The T.B. is Whipping Me", a duet with Syd Straw. The song would later appear on the band's 2014 rarities collection Alpha Mike Foxtrot: Rare Tracks 1994–2014.

The rendition of "Teach Your Children" from this album, credited to The Red Hots, charted at number 75 on Hot Country Songs in October 1994. Although it was not released as a single, Sammy Kershaw's cover of "Fire and Rain" was made into a music video.

Track listing
 "Teach Your Children" performed by Suzy Bogguss, Alison Krauss and Kathy Mattea with Crosby, Stills, and Nash
 "Fire and Rain" performed by Sammy Kershaw
 "Folsom Prison Blues" performed by Brooks & Dunn and Johnny Cash
 "Rock Me on the Water" performed by Kathy Mattea and Jackson Browne
 "Matchbox" performed by Carl Perkins, Duane Eddy, and The Mavericks
 "Crazy" performed by Jimmie Dale Gilmore, and Willie Nelson
 "Willie Short" performed by Mary Chapin Carpenter
 "Forever Young" written by Bob Dylan and performed by Johnny Cash
 "If These Old Walls Could Speak" performed by Nanci Griffith and Jimmy Webb
 "Up Above My Head / Blind Bartimus" performed by Marty Stuart with Jerry Sullivan and Tammy Sullivan
 "You Gotta Be My Baby" performed by Dolly Parton
 "Close Up the Honky Tonks" performed by Radney Foster
 "Goodbye Comes Hard for Me" performed by Mark Chesnutt
 "Pictures Don’t Lie" performed by Billy Ray Cyrus
 "When I Reach the Place I’m Going" performed by Patty Loveless
 "The T.B. Is Whipping Me" performed by Wilco with Syd Straw
 "Keep on the Sunny Side" performed by Randy Scruggs with Earl Scruggs, and Doc Watson

Musicians

 Eddie Bayers - drums
 Byrd Burton - electric guitar
 John Catchings - cello
 Joey Click - bass guitar
 Jerry Douglas - dobro
 Stuart Duncan - fiddle, mandolin
 Greg Fletcher - drums
 Pat Flynn - acoustic guitar
 Radney Foster - acoustic guitar
 Paul Franklin - steel guitar
 Vince Gill - mandolin
 Emory Gordy Jr. - bass guitar
 Rob Hajacos - fiddle
 Owen Hale - drums
 Brian Hanneman - electric guitar
 Tim Hensley - background vocals
 Corky Holbrook - bass guitar
 James Hooker - synthesizer
 Roy Huskey Jr. - upright bass
 Carl Jackson - background vocals
 John Barlow Jarvis - piano
 Jana King - background vocals
 Ron "Q.B." LaVega - bass guitar, cello
 Mike McAdam - electric guitar
 Paul McInerney - percussion
 Jimmy Maddax - piano
 Larry Marrs - background vocals
 Brent Mason - electric guitar
 Joshua Motohashi - steel guitar
 Bob Mummert - drums
 Steve Nathan - piano
 Don Potter - acoustic guitar
 Carmella Ramsey - background vocals
 Brent Rowan - electric guitar
 John Wesley Ryles - background vocals
 Earl Scruggs - banjo
 Randy Scruggs - acoustic guitar, electric guitar, harp, mandolin
 Terry Shelton - electric guitar
 Ricky Skaggs - mandolin
 Barton Stevens - keyboards
 Marty Stuart - background vocals
 Stephanie Sullivan - background vocals
 Christian Teal - violin
 Cindy Richardson-Walker - background vocals
 Biff Watson - acoustic guitar
 Doc Watson - acoustic guitar
 Jimmy Webb - piano, background vocals
 Willie Weeks - bass guitar
 Bergen White - background vocals
 Kris Wilkinson - violin
 Bob Wray - bass guitar

Chart performance

See also
Red Hot Organization

References

Red Hot Organization albums
Country music compilation albums
1994 compilation albums
Mercury Records compilation albums
Rock compilation albums
Albums produced by Mark Wright (record producer)